The United States national professional ballroom dance champions are crowned at the United States Dance Championships (formerly USDSC, and USBC), as recognized by the National Dance Council of America (NDCA) and the World Dance & DanceSport Council (WD&DSC).

The 9-dance division consists of American-style smooth waltz, tango, foxtrot, Viennese waltz and rhythm cha cha, rumba, East Coast swing, bolero, and mambo.

U.S. National Champions

See also 
U.S. National Dancesport Champions (Professional Standard)
U.S. National Dancesport Champions (Professional Latin)
U.S. National Dancesport Champions (Professional Smooth)
U.S. National Dancesport Champions (Professional Rhythm)
U.S. National Dancesport Champions (Professional 10-Dance)
Dancesport World Champions (smooth)
Dancesport World Champions (rhythm)

References

External links 
United States Dance Sport Championships (USDSC)
National Dance Council of America (NDCA)
Dancesport Competitions
Dancesport Info

Dancesport in the United States